Elwyn Harmon Silverman (12 April 1926 – 10 March 2019), known as Al Silverman, was a noted sports writer, the author of 10 books and numerous essays published in, among other publications, Playboy, Saga, and Sport magazine. Among his publications is I Am Third, written with Gale Sayers, which was adapted for the 1971 television movie Brian's Song.

In addition to his writing, Silverman also worked as an editor and publisher. He was editor of Sport Magazine from 1951 to 1963 and was CEO and chairman of Book of the Month Club from 1972 to 1988. Most recently, Silverman served as editor and publisher at Viking Press from 1989 to 1997.

Marriage 
Silverman was married to Rosa Silverman, a ceramic sculptor.

Bibliography 
 Silverman, Al. The Time of Their Lives: The Golden Age of Great American Book Publishers, Their Editors, and Authors. New York: Truman Talley, 2008. Print.

Notes

1926 births
2019 deaths
American book editors
American sportswriters
American magazine editors
American male journalists
20th-century American journalists
20th-century American male writers
20th-century American non-fiction writers
21st-century American male writers
21st-century American non-fiction writers
American male non-fiction writers